New Zealand rowers have competed at the Summer Olympics since the 1920 Summer Olympics in Antwerp, Belgium. Men have competed since the 1920 Antwerp Olympics and women have competed since the 1984 Los Angeles Olympics. 186 individuals have represented New Zealand in Olympic rowing (38 women and 148 men) and they have had 274 appearances (59 by women and 215 by men). Three athletes have won three medals (Simon Dickie, Mahé Drysdale, and Hamish Bond) and of those, Bond is the most successful with three gold medals.

With 29 Olympic medals including 14 gold medals, rowing is the country's most successful Olympic sport, followed by athletics with 26 medals including 10 gold medals.

Participation

Early years without participation
In the early years of the modern Olympic Games, people from New Zealand participated but not on behalf of New Zealand. The country's earliest participant, Victor Lindberg at the 1900 Summer Olympics, was only officially recognised as New Zealand's first competitor in 2014. In 1908 and 1912, a total of six New Zealanders competed as part of a team from Australasia. But none of these early New Zealand competitors were rowers. After the 1916 Summer Olympics in Berlin, Germany, were cancelled due to World War I, New Zealand sent its first rower to the 1920 Summer Olympics in Antwerp, Belgium.

1920 Summer Olympics

Darcy Hadfield was a dominant single scull rower of his time. He had won the 1919 Henley Peace Regatta "with ease", defeating the 1912 Olympic champion Wally Kinnear. Later in the same month, he won the single sculls at the Inter-Allied Games near Paris. The long journey from New Zealand by boat to Belgium saw him out of shape at the 1920 Summer Olympics, and he came third in the final race, winning bronze. He was New Zealand's only rower at the 1920 Summer Olympics. Hadfield was defeated in the semifinals of the single sculls by Jack Kelly Sr., the eventual gold medal winner, but took the bronze medal as the fastest losing semifinalist.

1924 Summer Olympics

The New Zealand Olympic Council decided to send eight rowers to the 1924 Summer Olympics in Paris, France. The biggest challenge at the time was a lack of funds and in the end, the New Zealand Olympic team was made up of only four athletes, none of them rowers. Darcy Hadfield was a dominant single sculler at the time but he had become professional in 1922 and was thus no longer eligible to compete at the Olympics.

1928 Summer Olympics

A New Zealand rowing eight was selected but was unable to travel to the games because of lack of funds. The chosen team consisted of Hubert McLean (Wellington), Crosby Morris (Canterbury), F. H. Brown (Canterbury), Clarrie Healey (Wanganui), Mick Brough (Otago), Vic Olsson (Marlborough), L. Brooker (Auckland), Bob Stiles (Canterbury), G. St. Clair (Auckland), and G. Duggan (Canterbury). The reserves were Glen Stiles (Canterbury) and N. Webber (Auckland).

1932 Summer Olympics

In 1932, seven rowing competitions were held, and New Zealand entered three boats with a total of eleven rowers: a coxless pair, a coxed four, and a coxed eight. Bob Stiles and Rangi Thompson won New Zealand's second rowing medal, a silver, in the coxless pair.

1936 Summer Olympics

In February 1936, the national rowing championships were held in Wellington. Even before the national championships, it was clear that no coxed eight would be sent due to the cost involved and lack of previous international success. Following the regatta, it was decided that no rowers were up to sufficient form, and none were nominated for the Summer Olympics in Berlin.

Interlude
The 1940 and 1944 Summer Olympics were both cancelled due to World War II. While New Zealand sent a team of 17 athletes to the 1948 Summer Olympics in London, no rowers were included.

1952 Summer Olympics

In 1952, seven rowing competitions were held, and New Zealand entered a single boat: a coxed four. The boat was eliminated in the repechage.

1956 Summer Olympics

In 1956, New Zealand entered boats in three of the seven events, manned by eight rowers.

1960 Summer Olympics

In 1960, seven rowing competitions were held, and New Zealand entered a single rower: James Hill competing in single sculls.

1964 Summer Olympics

In 1964, New Zealand entered boats in three of the seven events: men's single sculls, men's coxed four, and men's coxed eight.

1968 Summer Olympics

In 1968, New Zealand qualified an eight and had a pool of four rowers and a cox as a travelling reserve. Preparations were held in Christchurch at Kerr's Reach on the Avon River. The reserve rowers were unhappy with the "spare parts" tag and felt that they were good enough to perhaps win a medal if put forward as a coxed four. The trainer, Rusty Robertson, commented about them:

the funniest looking crew you've ever seen

There were stern discussions with the New Zealand selectors. In a training run, the coxed four was leading the eight over the whole race. In the end, the reserve rowers got their way and New Zealand entered boats in two of the seven events: men's coxed four and men's coxed eight. In the coxed four, the teams from East and West Germany were among the favourites; the United Team of Germany had won this event at the last Olympics, but that was the last appearance of the German United Team. The teams from the Soviet Union and Italy were also among the medal contenders. The East German team won their heat and semi-final in the fastest overall time, but the New Zealand team unexpectedly controlled the final and defeated the East Germans by over two seconds. This was New Zealand's third rowing medal, and its first gold medal in rowing. The medals were presented by IOC vice-president Konstantin Adrianow. The heat, semi-final and final were the only three races that the coxed four ever rowed.

New Zealand's coxed eight was expected to win, and Wybo Veldman later recalled:

We were hot favourites but the wheels fell off. We should have won it, finished fourth, got nothing, a terrible experience.

In 1968, New Zealand's first golden era in rowing began. Under trainer Robertson, the era would last until the 1976 Summer Olympics. Both the 1968 coxed four and Robertson would later be inducted into the New Zealand Sports Hall of Fame.

1972 Summer Olympics

1972 was the last year that only men competed at the Olympic rowing events. New Zealand entered boats in four of the seven events at the Munich Games, and won medals in two of the competitions. The members of the gold medal winning 1972 New Zealand eight came from nine different clubs, which said a lot about Robertson's ability as a coach to blend individuals into a strong sum. The team would win Sportsman of the Year Awards in both 1971 and 1972. The crew of the coxed eight standing on the victory dais overcome with emotion and "bawling like babies" is one of New Zealand's most memorable sporting moments. The coxed eights medal ceremony was also the first time "God Defend New Zealand" played as New Zealand's national anthem instead of "God Save the Queen". Before and during the Olympic Games, the New Zealand rowing team stayed in the Bavarian village of Lenggries, where they were adopted by the locals as their own. When the 2007 World Rowing Championships were again held in Munich, Chris Nilsson—who was by then a rowing coach—arranged for the New Zealand team to stay at Lenggries once more, rekindling old friendships.

1976 Summer Olympics

Women were invited for the first time to compete in Olympic rowing events at the 1976 Summer Olympics in Montreal, Quebec, Canada, and 16 nations sent female competitors, but New Zealand was not one of those nations. New Zealand sent 18 men for three of the eight male rowing competitions. When the coxed eight came "only" third, Robertson was dismissed as the national rowing coach; he went to Australia to continue his coaching career.

1980 Summer Olympics

1980 was the year of the Summer Olympics boycott led by the United States. The New Zealand Olympic and Commonwealth Games Association (NZOCGA) was initially determined to go ahead with New Zealand's participation and named an Olympic team of over 100 athletes, including a number of rowers, but individual athletes and the NZOCGA eventually yielded under the pressure exerted by the Third National Government of New Zealand under Robert Muldoon. Four New Zealand athletes went to Moscow as independents, but none of them were rowers. Those rowers who had been nominated for Moscow included Tony Brook, Alan Cotter, Stephen Donaldson, Duncan Holland, Peter Jansen, Robert Robinson, Anthony Russell.

1984 Summer Olympics

In 1984, New Zealand's first female rower attended the Olympics: Stephanie Foster competed in the single sculls. There were again eight competitions for men, and New Zealand entered twenty-one rowers across five boats. The coxless four won a gold medal, while the coxed four won bronze. Due to the Eastern Bloc boycott and the absence of East Germany and the Soviet Union, New Zealand was the strong favourite in the coxed eight event, but came a disappointing fourth. New Zealand sent 18 men for three of the eight male rowing competitions. At the time, Dudley Storey was the national coach.

Men

Women

1988 Summer Olympics

New Zealand entered five boats across the fourteen boat classes; four of those for men and a coxless pair for the women. There were 15 New Zealand rowers in total, and three bronze medals were won, including the first by female rowing medal. Greg Johnston and Chris White were rowing in both the coxed pair and the coxed four, but once they qualified for the semi-finals, they decided to concentrate on the larger boat and did not race the coxed pair any longer.

Men

Women

1992 Summer Olympics

New Zealand qualified four boats for the 1992 Summer Olympics in Barcelona, Spain: men's single sculls, men's coxless four, men's coxed four, and women's double sculls. Twelve rowers competed for New Zealand, but there were no medals won in rowing in Barcelona.

Men

Women

1996 Summer Olympics

New Zealand qualified five boats for the 1996 Summer Olympics: men's single sculls, men's pair, men's coxless four, men's lightweight double sculls, and women's double sculls. Eleven rowers competed for New Zealand but like in 1992, there were no medals won in rowing.

Men

Women

2000 Summer Olympics

New Zealand qualified three boats for the 2000 Summer Olympics in Sydney, Australia: men's single sculls, men's coxless four, and women's single sculls. Six rowers competed for New Zealand, and Rob Waddell—at his second appearance at Olympic Games—won a gold medal.

Men

Women

2004 Summer Olympics

New Zealand rowers qualified five boats with 11 rowers; two boats for men's and three for women's races. Twin sisters Caroline and Georgina Evers-Swindell went into their double sculls as the favourites and did not disappoint; they beat the German team of Peggy Waleska and Britta Oppelt by 1 sec to win gold.

Men

Women

2008 Summer Olympics

New Zealand rowers qualified eight boats with 16 rowers; five boats for men's and three for women's races. Mahé Drysdale won his first Olympic medal (bronze) and the men's pair of George Bridgewater and Nathan Twaddle also won a bronze medal. But the lasting rowing memory from the Beijing Summer Games is the gold medal by the Evers-Swindell twins, who beat their German opponents by 0.01 sec. The twins have twice won the Lonsdale Cup (in 2003 and 2008), awarded by the New Zealand Olympic Committee for the most outstanding contribution to an Olympic or Commonwealth sport during the previous year. In 2016, the twins were awarded the Thomas Keller Medal, the highest honour available in world rowing.

Men

Women

2012 Summer Olympics

New Zealand rowers had their most successful campaign to date at the 2012 Summer Olympics in Great Britain. Eleven boats with 26 rowers had qualified, and three gold and two bronze medals were won. The men won gold in the single sculls, double sculls, and pair, and bronze in the lightweight double sculls. The women won bronze in the pair. Hamish Bond later wrote that he watched Nathan Cohen and Joseph Sullivan in their final, and with 500 m to go, they were 3.5 sec down on the leaders and in fourth place; whilst they were the reigning world champions and had dominated the qualifying races, Bond was convinced that they had no chance of winning their final. But they had the most impressive sprint and won by half a length. It gave Bond confidence that he could win his race, too, and so he did (with Eric Murray) the following day.

Men

Women

2016 Summer Olympics

The 2016 Olympic campaign in Rio de Janeiro at the Rodrigo de Freitas Lagoon was another success for the New Zealand rowing team. The country's largest team ever, with 36 rowers, competed with 11 boats. Mahé Drysdale in the single sculls, and Hamish Bond and Eric Murray in the pair repeated their gold medal performances from four years earlier. The women's pair also repeated the success from London and gained bronze once again.

New Zealand initially qualified ten out of a possible fourteen boats for each of the rowing classes listed below. The majority of the rowing crews confirmed Olympic places for their boats at the 2015 FISA World Championships in Lac d'Aiguebelette, France, while a women's single sculls rower had added one more boat to the New Zealand roster as a result of a top three finish at the 2016 European & Final Qualification Regatta in Lucerne, Switzerland. Thee teams had to have also competed at the New Zealand Rowing Championships, held in Lake Karapiro, to assure their selection to the Olympic team for the Games.

The rowing team was named on 4 March 2016. On 1 July 2016, the Russian men's quadruple sculls boat was disqualified due to a doping violation, resulting in New Zealand gaining the men's quadruple sculls slot as the next-best non-qualifier. For the first time in Olympic history, New Zealand rowers participated in the men's lightweight four and the women's eight.

The 2013–16 Olympic cycle was the first full cycle under the auspicious of High Performance Sport New Zealand (HPSNZ). Rowing was the largest benefactor of HPSNZ's investment, receiving $32.1 million of the $162.2 million spent on Olympic sports during the four-year cycle.

Men

Women

2020 Summer Olympics

New Zealand's team for the Tokyo Olympics is made up by 32 rowers and coxswains, plus Charlotte Spence, Davina Waddy, and Ollie Maclean as reserve rowers. The main qualification event were the 2019 World Rowing Championships, where nine boat classes were qualified: M1x, M2x, M2−, W1x, W2x, LW2x, W4x, W2−, W8+.

Rowing New Zealand announced in 2019 that its medal target for Tokyo was five. In early 2020, rowing commentator Ian Anderson listed the women's pair, the women's double scull, and the women's lightweight double scull as favourites in their boat classes, adding that the women's eight and the women's single scull were also "major contenders for gold". New Zealand had started in all 14 Olympic boat classes at the event but the LM2x, M4x, M4−, W4− and M8+ did not qualify. 

The men's lightweight double scull (LM2x) had a further chance to qualify at the May 2021 Asian & Oceania Qualification Regatta but New Zealand did not start there. The other four boat classes had a further chance to qualify at the May 2021 World Rowing Final Olympic Qualification Regatta at the Rotsee in Switzerland. Only the men's eight was at the start and the team qualified through coming first.

Meanwhile, reigning world champion Zoe McBride (LW2−) had unexpectedly announced her retirement from rowing in March 2021 over health concerns. Rowing New Zealand tried to team up various lightweight rowers with Jackie Kiddle, including Lucy Strack who had retired from rowing in 2014, to fill the seat but no combinations resulted in performances that would have had a medal chance. A month after McBride's retirement, Rowing New Zealand withdrew the lightweight women's pair boat class from the Olympics, with Kiddle as a reigning world champion not travelling to Tokyo.

;Men

;Women

The make up of the eight had initially not been determined, with ten rowers—including two pairs of sisters—who were to travel to the Olympics: Kerri Gowler and Grace Prendergast (who will also compete in the pair), Jackie Gowler, Beth Ross, Phoebe Spoors, Kirstyn Goodger, Kelsey Bevan, Lucy Spoors, Emma Dyke, and Ella Greenslade. The entries were confirmed on 9 July 2021, with the coxless pair team of Kerri Gowler and Prendergast not being given double-duty. In the end, this changed again, K. Gowler and Prendergast did double-duty, with Goodger and P. Spoors remaining as reserves.

Medal table

New Zealand rowers
There have been 274 Olympic rowing appearances from New Zealand thus far. New Zealand men have been competing since the 1920 Summer Olympics, and make up 215 of those appearances. New Zealand women have been competing since the 1984 Summer Olympics, and have accumulated 59 appearances.

The following table shows the individual rowers and coxswains that make up the 274 appearances, with many athletes having attended several Summer Olympics. In total, 186 individuals have represented the country at the Olympics, with 148 men and 38 women. These individuals have won 43 gold, 19 silver, and 30 bronze medals, i.e. a total of 92 medals. So far, five individuals have attended four Summer Olympics: Chris White (1984 to 1996), Mahé Drysdale (2004–2016), Eric Murray (2004–2016), and Hamish Bond and Emma Twigg have attended all Games since the 2008 Beijing Olympics.

Three athletes have won three Olympic medals: Simon Dickie (1968, 1972, and 1976), Mahé Drysdale (2008, 2012, and 2016), and Hamish Bond. Of those, Bond is the most successful with three gold medals. Six rowers or coxswains have won two gold medals: Simon Dickie, Dick Joyce, Mahé Drysdale, Caroline and Georgina Evers-Swindell, and Eric Murray.

Notes

References

 
Rowing at the Summer Olympics
Rowers, New Zealand
Lists of rowers
Rowers